Bendik is a village in the Lori Province of Armenia. In 1995 it became part of the nearby community of Shamlugh.

References 

Populated places in Lori Province